Ramón Mota Sánchez (22 August 1922 – 15 February 2013) was a Mexican politician and retired general affiliated with the Institutional Revolutionary Party. He served as Senator of the LVIII and LIX Legislatures of the Mexican Congress representing the Federal District and as Deputy of the LV and LVII Legislatures.

References

1922 births
2013 deaths
People from Mexico City
Mexican military personnel
Members of the Senate of the Republic (Mexico)
Members of the Chamber of Deputies (Mexico)
Institutional Revolutionary Party politicians
21st-century Mexican politicians
20th-century Mexican politicians